Mount Capley is a peak,  high, in the Nimbus Hills of the Heritage Range. It was mapped by the United States Geological Survey from surveys and from U.S. Navy air photos, 1961–66, and named by the Advisory Committee on Antarctic Names for Lieutenant Commander Joe H. Capley, U.S. Navy, pilot on photographic flights over Marie Byrd Land and Ellsworth Land during Operation Deep Freeze 1965 and 1966.

See also
 Mountains in Antarctica

References
 

Mountains of Ellsworth Land